Lophoplusia violacea is a moth of the family Noctuidae. It was first described by Otto Herman Swezey in 1920. It is endemic to the Hawaiian island of Kauai.

External links

Endemic moths of Hawaii
Plusiinae